MTV Czech Republic was a 24-hour music and entertainment television channel that served the Czech Republic and Slovakia. 
The channel was launched on 29 November 2009 under a licensing agreement between MTV Networks Europe, a subsidiary of MTV Networks and CME, the owner of TV Nova.

The channel featured local advertising and sponsorship opportunities, along with subtitled or dubbed programming in Czech. The channel used a similar on-air identity as other MTV channels  in Europe and around the world, although it had also produced some idents and graphics of its own and had won several awards. It was also one of the few widescreen MTV channels in the world, at the time of its existence.

MTV Czech broadcast weekly on average over 100 hours of pure music content, including various blocks, making it the only MTV channel in the world to do so, alongside MTV Adria.  The most music on MTV Czech is played on Saturday's, from noon (12:05 PM) till Sunday morning (09:35 AM). That is 21 hours straight of pure music content, which basically respects and reflects the original concept of MTV of a 24-hour music-only channel.

MTV Czech mostly played current music videos or videos from the past few years, although occasionally it aired older videos from the early 2000s and mid to late 1990s.  The oldest music videos to air on the network were "Imagine" by John Lennon and "Like a Virgin" by Madonna. Unlike most of the other music channels from MTV Networks around the world, MTV Czech usually played music videos uncut and in full length.

The channel was closed on 31 December 2013.

History

 MTV Czech was launched on 29 November 2009 at 9 PM, replacing the existing feed of MTV Europe with the region.
 The channel launched with a 60 seconds countdown, playing the instrumental theme of We Will Rock You in the background.
 The first music video ever played was Empire State of Mind by Jay-Z.
 During launch, MTV Czech was one of the first widescreen MTV channels in the world.
 Initially, in promotion supporting the launch and during the first months of broadcast, the original first slogan was "Já jsem MTV!" (I am MTV!).
 The channel broadcast a range of music and popular culture programming, mainly imported from MTV US, MTV UK, VH1 and BET.
 On 8 November 2010, MTV Czech started airing new channel idents and the station planned to produce and broadcast local idents of its own in the near future.
 On 18 November 2010, MTV Czech was the first station in the world to broadcast the clip for the new single "Sing" by My Chemical Romance in a 'World Exclusive' television premiere.
 On 29 November 2010, MTV Czech celebrated its first year of broadcast with special party-themed videos, which were featured in between shows and focused around a group of young people at a party, along with the moderators of MTV Czech. These videoclips continued throughout the whole week and varied each day, featuring amongst other guests also the famous Czech band Charlie Straight, who have won two EMA awards for Best Czech & Slovak act.
 Since 6 December 2010, MTV Czech started broadcasting regularly short segments/fillers with the two moderators of the station - Hanka Zajíčková and Dominik Turza. These segments involved different topics each week somehow related to the programming of MTV in the Czech Republic.
 On 17 December 2010, MTV Czech debuted the short film Runaway from Kanye West in a European television premiere.
 During Christmas 2010, MTV Czech used winter idents, which could be seen for example also on MTV UK. In comparison with the UK feed, the idents have aired on MTV Czech in their original widescreen aspect ratio and without the channel logo present on screen.
 On 5 January 2011, MTV Czech debuted its first local show called "Backstage". The two moderators of the station - Hanka Zajíčková and Dominik Turza, take viewers behind the scenes of various concerts, parties, festivals and entertainment shows in the Czech Republic. Viewers can also look forward to interviews with popular singers and bands, not only from the Czech Republic and Slovakia, but from abroad as well.
 On 17 February 2011, it was reported that Lady Gaga's video to "Born This Way" will debut on the channel on 24 February in a 'World Exclusive' television premiere, but this did not happen, as the release date was officially postponed to 28 February The video debuted on MTV Czech at 19:01 CET local time, Monday, making it still the first TV channel in the world to broadcast the video because of time zone differences.
 During Spring 2011, MTV Czech used the line "On. On MTV!" in its promos as opposed to previously used "On MTV!". Adding a second "On." emphasized that the shows could be seen only on MTV.
 On 11 March 2011, MTV Czech, along with some other MTV channels around the world, debuted the music video to Rope of Foo Fighters in an exclusive premiere.
 On 14 March 2011, MTV Czech debuted a new music video from Czech band Charlie Straight in a 7-day exclusive premiere, showing support also for Czech artists.
 On 1 May 2011, MTV Czech removed the one-hour music block "MTV Basechart" from its programming, most probably due to lower ratings. This was the first and also last time the amount of music content on the channel was slightly reduced.
 Instead, later that month, MTV Czech launched two new music blocks titled "Home Sweet Home" and "In Love With MTV", which focus on music from local artists and love songs.
 On 29 May it was announced that MTV Czech will rebrand on 1 July 2011, along with other international MTV channels, adopting the US on-screen logo and new graphics.
 On 30 June the channel started using the new logo on its website and programming guide, although the structure of the website has remained the same.
 On 1 July 2011, 06:00 AM, MTV Czech rebranded and started using the new logo on-air (exactly same as in the US), along with new idents and graphics. They are a unique blend between the previous branding by Universal Everything and the current branding of MTV US by Popkern.
 On 1 July 2011, MTV Czech also changed the words used in the programme progress info bar, highlighting what the viewer is watching, from 'Right Now' to 'You're Watching', making it more simple and personal.
 The third change during the first day of rebrand was the introduction of 'SMS Live' - a service where viewers could text short messages to MTV and see them appear live on-air. It has been limited to the music blocks 'Party Zone' and 'In Love With MTV', which air regularly once a week. 'SMS Live' lasted until 1 December 2011, when it was removed.
 On 29 July 2011, MTV Czech updated its opening theme for 'MTV Menu', replacing the old MTV logo with the new one, confirming that music will remain an important part of its programming even in the future.
 On 5 August 2011, MTV Czech updated also its opening theme for 'MTV Hits', replacing the old MTV logo with the new one, confirming once again that music will remain an important part of its programming even in the future.
 On 8 August 2011, MTV Czech started airing a 1m20s long video using the song 'Youth' by MGMT, with scenes from various music videos and reality shows, to promote the youth. The end of the video features the headline "Youth Is Amazing".
 On 9 August 2011, MTV Czech updated another opening theme with the new logo, this time for the rap/r'n'b block 'Urban'. This is the third opening theme for a music block to be updated after the July rebrand. Eventually all music blocks later updated their themes with the new logo.
 On 1 September 2011, the channel updated its "Coming Up Next - Menu" bumper and started using small image slides (thumbnails) on the side to improve communication with its viewers. It was the first and only MTV channel in Europe to do so.
 In September 2011, MTV Czech premiered the new series Awkward. 2 days ahead of the UK premiere on MTV UK. Apart from that, season 4 of Jersey Shore premiered on the Czech feed 5 days prior to the European premiere on MTV Europe.
 On 1 October 2011, MTV Czech started using a new, third, slogan "MTV - Máš To V Sobě" (It's in you!). The previous, second, slogan "MTV Jsi Ty!" (MTV Is You!) was used from Summer 2010 till September 30, 2011.
 In mid-October MTV Czech started using several other headlines, along with the new slogan, in short 5-second bumpers. These headlines consist of the letters of MTV:
Má To Vyřvaný (Amp It Up!)
Musíš To Vidět (You Must See This!)
Má To Vnady (It Has Bossom!)
Máme Tady Večírek (We Have A Party!)
Můžeš To Vyhrát (You Can Win This!)
 The last headline Můžeš To Vyhrát (You Can Win This!) refers to a competition launched by MTV Czech to accompany its second birthday. Viewers could send their own headlines in the upcoming four weeks. Each week a winner was picked, receiving VIP tickets to MTV's private birthday party and the option to see their headline included on-air.
 During Christmas 2011, MTV Czech celebrated the Holidays with themed programming and mainly aired music videos related to Christmas. There were also numerous TOP 10 countdowns, including 'Best of the Decade', 'Best of Urban 2011', 'Best of Europe 2011', 'Best Singer of 2011', 'Best Alternative of 2011' and more. MTV also aired several special bumpers, similar to those of 2010. The Christmas-centred programming lasted from 24 December 2011 to 1 January 2012. The oldest music video to air during the week was Last Christmas by British pop duo Wham!
 From 9 to 14 February 2012 MTV celebrated Valentine's Day with several new bumpers depicting love between two animated characters. The idents incorporated mainly pink, purple, white and red colours.
 On 15 February 2012, MTV commemorated the death of Whitney Houston and paid tribute to the singer by airing blocks of her music videos throughout the day, a 5-minute segment about her tragic death, a special bumper and running text at the bottom of the screen, a crawler, which stated the following: "We are deeply saddened by the tragic loss of Whitney Houston, who died on Saturday in Los Angeles at age of 48."
 On 8 March 2012, MTV Czech started using short subliminal messages during broadcast as promotion for the upcoming premiere of Beavis and Butt-head. These animated messages were only 1 to 3 seconds long and involved Beavis and Butt-head randomly appearing on the screen, usually beating each other. Another variant of these messages uses colourful silhouettes of their figures. These messages overlay the channel's logo and on-air graphics and have been used exclusively in the past only on MTV US throughout October 2011 to highlight the series premiere. The messages have evoked interest in viewers, causing them to discuss this curiosity online.
 On 23 March MTV Czech officially started promoting the series premiere using the same teasers that have aired in the U.S. These promos have been localized into Czech and it was the first time that MTV Czech has decided to import original MTV US promos instead of producing their own. Apart from that, 6 new bumpers to promote the series have been produced.
 On 8 April 2012, the controversial original uncut version of Michael Jackson's Black or White (without graffiti) was aired on MTV Czech at 4PM during a Michael Jackson 'Top 10' countdown. Due to the fact the channel decided to air also uncut versions of Michael Jackon's other videos, such as 'Bad' and 'Thriller', it ended up being 22 minutes behind schedule.
 On 9 April 2012, MTV Czech received a refresh and started airing a new set of idents by MTV World Design Studio/Staat/Buck - Group Hug, Chameleon and Party Animal.
 Caged premiered on 14 May 2012.
 In mid-June, MTV rolled out a set of new summer idents by company "123 Klan". They include similar characters, along with a tiger, that have been present in bumpers used for Valentine's Day. MTV Czech produced also several bumpers of its own and headed out to all of the major summer festivals and events. Footage from these events was later shown in "Backstage". 
 Throughout the first week of September 2012, MTV updated and started airing new promos for all of its main music blocks - including 'Alternative Nation', 'Home Sweet Home', 'In Love With MTV', 'MTV Rocks!', 'Party Zone', 'Urban' and 'Wishlist'. After a short break, a set of new local DJ's returned to put together the 'Party Zone' playlists.
 On 1 October 2012, MTV Czech received another refresh and started airing a new set of idents by MTV World Design Studio/Buck - Brodown, Dream Big and Infectious.
 At the end of October 2012, MTV Czech rolled out a set of three Halloween-themed bumpers that included characters from similar idents used during summer and spring. These were once again produced by company "123 Klan". 
 On 28 November 2012, MTV Czech celebrated its 3rd Birthday, accompanied by a party at local popular club ROXY. The event was open also for the public.
 Throughout December 2012, MTV aired a set of Christmas themed bumpers that followed in footsteps of the previous ones used during Autumn, Summer and Spring. They featured the same characters and depicted them in a snow-covered holiday environment. This was the final set of idents by studio "123 Klan". During the holidays, MTV Czech broadcast again several themed musical blocks and charts, although to a lesser extent than in the previous year. 
 By February 2013, MTV Czech began dropping its current on-air branding and adopting parts of the branding of MTV US. Most new promos produced and aired after 1 February use the on-air identity and style of MTV US.
 Underemployed premiered on 1 February 2013 at 9PM. 
 The L.A. Complex premiered on 17 April 2013 at 9PM.
 From 5 to 26 May 2013, Chill Out Zone was put on hiatus in favor of Geordie Shore seasons one to three marathon re-runs.
 Ke$ha: My Crazy Beautiful Life premiered on 27 May 2013 at 10PM.
 Since late May 2013, MTV Czech has started airing a weekly night block titled "A Night With...", each week focusing on a different artist.
 Washington Heights premiered on 9 June 2013 at 9PM.
 In July MTV started airing two new idents (Adrenaline Rush and Underdog) and most of the music blocks (In Love With MTV, Party Zone, Urban, Wishlist) once again received new promos.
 As of November 2013, MTV Czech Republic still broadcast music videos in a content ratio of 50% music and 50% reality shows, something not seen in other territories where all of the music content was replaced and moved to other MTV channels or removed completely - as for example in the US, UK, Latin America and Russia. At that time, the only MTV channel with more music content than MTV Czech was MTV Adria, with a content ratio of 70% music and 30% reality shows. MTV Czech also remained one of the few widescreen MTV channels in the world even after the global July 2011 rebrand, though it was expected for the majority of other MTV channels in Europe to switch to 16:9 by that time as well.
 In late November 2013 CME announced it will not renew its current licence with MTV Networks for operating the channel and MTV brand in the Czech and Slovak market due to increased debts and will hand over the licence back to Viacom.
 On the same day Viacom has stated it will take charge of MTV Czech Republic as of 1 January 2014, and re-launch the channel in the region on that date, promising more shows, more local content and earlier premieres.  
 On 21 November 2013, Viacom announced that MTV Czech will cease operations on 31 December 2013.
 On 1 January 2014, MTV Europe started broadcasting again in Czech Republic and Slovakia. Run from London, UK, it started featuring additional audio and subtitle tracks in Czech, Hungarian, Romanian and other languages relevant to countries where local MTV feeds have ceased or are planning to cease operations. MTV Europe currently features US-imported longform shows throughout most of its daily schedule, with very little music content appearing late in the night and during the early morning hours. Unlike MTV Czech, it no longer features any specialist music shows.

Programming

Music series
 Alternative Nation - classic programming, alternative music
 A Night With... - weekly night block featuring various artists 
 Budíček - music aimed to wake you up, aka 'Wake Up Hits' or 'AMTV Dancefloor Chart - top ten dance singles of the week (On Hiatus)   
 Home Sweet Home - music block of Czech and Slovak artists
 Chill Out Zone - classic programming, relaxing and calm music
 In Love With MTV - music block of love themed music
 MTV GO! - energetic music aimed to charge you up
 MTV Hits - current and past hits
 MTV Live HD - live performances
 MTV Menu - playlist of music put together daily by MTV, both past and current
 MTV Push - featured artist of the month
 MTV Rocks! - music block of rock music, formerly titled 'MTV Rock Chart'''
 MTV Unplugged - live performances MTV World Stage - live performances Music Non Stop - nonstop music of all genres and ages Party Zone - classic programming, playlist put together by different local DJ's or MTV each week Storytellers - artists telling stories and performing in front of a live audience (on hiatus)
 This Is The New Sh*t - newest music from various artists, updated each week TOP 10 - top 10 singles of various artists, changes each day/week (list featured below)
 TOP 20 - various artists and their top 20 commercial hits Urban - music block of hip-hop, rap and r'n'b'; both old and new
 Wishlist - current music viewers can vote on each week through the MTV website

News series
 Backstage - pre-recorded or live backstage coverage of various festivals, concerts and events with the two hosts
 Movies.MTV - short weekly highlights of current theatrical releases

Documentary series
 Behind the Music (On Hiatus)
 True Life (Season 9/On Hiatus)

Reality series
 16 and Pregnant (Season 4/Reruns)
 Catfish (Season 2/Premiere)
 Geordie Shore (Season 6/Premiere) 
 Jersey Shore (Season 6/Reruns)
 Kesha: My Crazy Beautiful Life (Season 1/Reruns)
 MADE (Season 12/Reruns)
 Plain Jane (Season 2/Reruns)
 Punk'd (Season 9/Reruns) 
 Ridiculousness (Season 3/Premiere)
 Snooki & JWoww (Season 2/Reruns)
 Teen Mom (Season 4/Reruns)
 Teen Mom 2 (Season 4/Premiere)
 The Real World (Season 27/On Hiatus)
 Washington Heights (Season 1/Reruns)
 Young and Married (Season 1/Reruns)

Competitive series
 The Challenge (Season 23:Battle of the Seasons/On Hiatus)

Comedy series
 Awkward.''' (Season 3/Premiere)
 MTV2's Guy Code (Season 1/Reruns)
 The Inbetweeners (Season 1/Reruns)
 Zach Stone Is Gonna Be Famous (Season 1/Premiere)

Drama series
 Skins (Season 1/Reruns)
 Hollywood Heights (Season 1/Premiere)
 The L.A. Complex (Season 1/Reruns)
 Underemployed (Season 1/Reruns)

Animated series
 Beavis and Butt-head'' (Season 9/Reruns)
 Crash Canyon (Season 1/Reruns)

References

External links
 Official Site
 Official Facebook Page
 Official Twitter Page

MTV channels
Central European Media Enterprises
Television stations in the Czech Republic
Television channels and stations established in 2009
Television channels and stations disestablished in 2013
2009 establishments in the Czech Republic
Music organizations based in the Czech Republic
Music organisations based in Slovakia
TV Nova (Czech Republic)